Merrinee is a locality situated in the Sunraysia region. It is situated about 7 kilometres west of Pirlta and 11 kilometres east of Karawinna, on the Red Cliffs-Meringur Road. 

The Morkalla railway line opened on 10 April 1924 with a goods, grain and passenger siding, followed by the post office on 30 May 1924. The railway closed in 1988.

The general area contains a number of previous localities which existed when the population was larger, namely Thurla  which had a post office open from 1925 until 1940, Benetook  with a post office from 1925 until 1946 and Pirlta  with a post office from 1911 until 1961.

References

Towns in Victoria (Australia)
Mallee (Victoria)